List of railway stations in Perth may refer to:

List of Transperth railway stations
List of Transwa railway stations